Abd al-Razzaq al-Dandashi (1899–1935) was a Syrian intellectual and Arab nationalist activist. He was one of the founders of the League of Nationalist Action.

Biography
Al-Dandashi was born to the wealthy Dandashi clan, a major political family based in Talkalakh. Al-Dandashi graduated from a university in Belgium with a degree in law. During his time at the university, he participated in Arab activist circles. After returning to Syria, he established a law office.

In 1932, Dandashi and other Arab intellectuals convened in the Mount Lebanon village of Qarnayel and founded the League of Nationalist Action (LNA), a nationalist political group whose main goal was coordinated Arab action in ending European colonialism in the Arab world. Dandashi became the secretary-general of the LNA. With his leadership position, he built a large power base, consisting of intellectuals, lawyers, and student activists. Under al-Dandashi, the LNA emerged as a more confrontational counterweight to the National Bloc which ultimately favored negotiating Syria's independence from French rule through diplomatic and other non-violent means. According to Syrian historian Sami Moubayed, al-Dandashi was "an impassioned orator and a hard-line Arab nationalist".

Al-Dandashi died in 1935 when he looked out from the window while riding a train and his head subsequently struck a tunnel wall. Al-Dandashi's death, the subsequent defection of Zaki al-Arsuzi to the Ba'ath Party and the expulsion of Sabri al-Asali greatly reduced the influence of the LNA in Syrian politics.

References

Bibliography

1899 births
1935 deaths
Syrian politicians
Road incident deaths in Syria
Syrian Arab nationalists